David McKeon (born 25 July 1992) is an Australian competition swimmer.  At the 2012 Summer Olympics in London, he competed in the men's 400-metre freestyle, finishing in 14th place in the heats, failing to reach the final.

Personal life
McKeon was born on 25 July 1992 in Wollongong, New South Wales, Australia. He is the son of the former Olympic swimmer Ron McKeon and Commonwealth Games swimmer Susie. He has two sisters, Kaitlin and Emma, a swimmer who has won 4 Olympic medals which is the most won by any Australian Olympian.

Swimming
McKeon won a gold medal in the 400 metres freestyle at the 2011 Summer Universiade in Shenzhen, China.

At the 2012 Summer Olympics held in London, United Kingdom, he competed in the 400 metre freestyle, finishing fifth in his heat and 14th overall with a time of 3:48.57, but failing to qualify for the final. He then swam in the heats of the 4 × 200 metre freestyle relay, helping Australia to qualify for the final where they eventually placed fifth.

In 2013 he competed at the 15th FINA World Championships held in Barcelona, Spain, where he placed 12th in the 400 metre freestyle and was part of an Australian quartet, alongside Ned McKendry, Alexander Graham and Jarrod Killey, which failed to advance to the final of the 4 × 200 metre freestyle relay after placing ninth in the heats.

He represented Australia at the 2014 Commonwealth Games held in Glasgow, Scotland, where he won a gold medal and a silver medal. Alongside Cameron McEvoy, Ned McKendry and Thomas Fraser-Holmes he set a Commonwealth Games record to win the gold medal in the 4 × 200 metre freestyle relay. He won the silver medal in the 400 metre freestyle, finishing behind Canada's Ryan Cochrane in a time of 3:44.09. He also placed fourth in the final of the 200 metre freestyle.

In April 2016 McKeon was selected as part of the Australian team for the 2016 Summer Olympics due to be held in Rio de Janeiro, Brazil. His sister Emma was also selected meaning the pair were the first brother and sister to swim at an Olympic Games for Australia since John and Ilsa Konrads in 1960. He also competed in the 400 metre freestyle and the 4 × 200 metre freestyle relay.

See also
List of Commonwealth Games medallists in swimming (men)

References

External links
 
 
 
 
 
 
 
 

1992 births
Living people
Sportspeople from Wollongong
Australian male freestyle swimmers
Olympic swimmers of Australia
Swimmers at the 2012 Summer Olympics
Swimmers at the 2016 Summer Olympics
Swimmers at the 2014 Commonwealth Games
Commonwealth Games gold medallists for Australia
Commonwealth Games silver medallists for Australia
World Aquatics Championships medalists in swimming
Commonwealth Games medallists in swimming
Universiade medalists in swimming
Universiade gold medalists for Australia
Medalists at the 2011 Summer Universiade
Medallists at the 2014 Commonwealth Games